Velikov (masculine) or Velikova (feminine) is a Bulgarian and Serbian surname.  Notable people with the surname include:

Nikolai Velikov (born 1945), Russian figure skater and coach
Ludmila Velikova (born 1947), Russian figure skater and coach
Petar Velikov (born 1951), Bulgarian chess grandmaster
Igor Velikov (born 1976), Bulgarian/American investor and philanthropist
Veselin Velikov (born 1977), Bulgarian footballer
Maxim Velikov (born 1982), Russian ice hockey player
Radoslav Velikov (born 1983), Bulgarian freestyle wrestler

Bulgarian-language surnames